The 2019–20 season is Vanoli Cremona's 21st in existence and the club's 11th consecutive season in the top flight of Italian basketball.

Overview 
The 2019-20 season was hit by the coronavirus pandemic that compelled the federation to suspend and later cancel the competition without assigning the title to anyone. Cremona ended the championship in 6th position.

Kit 
Supplier: Errea / Sponsor: Vanoli

Players

Current roster

Depth chart

Squad changes

In

|}

Out

|}

Confirmed 

|}

Coach

Unsuccessful deals 
The following deal never activated and the player's contract was withdrawn before the beginning of the season.

Competitions

SuperCup 

Cremona took part in the 25th edition of the Italian Basketball Supercup as the 2019 Italian Basketball Cup winner. They lost the competition at the semifinal, after one overtime against Banco di Sardegna Sassari.

Serie A

Italian Cup 
Cremona qualified to the 2020 Italian Basketball Cup having ended the first half of the season in 5th place. They lost the first match in the quarter finals against AX Armani Exchange Milano.

References 

2019–20 in Italian basketball by club